AACE may refer to:

 AACE International (Association for the Advancement of Cost Engineering)
 American Association of Clinical Endocrinologists